Charles Halliley (5 December 1852 – 23 March 1929) was an English first-class cricketer, who played three matches for Yorkshire County Cricket Club in 1872, against Lancashire, Nottinghamshire, and Surrey respectively.

Halliley was born in Earlsheaton, Dewsbury, Yorkshire, England, and was a right-handed batsman. Yorkshire lost the Roses Match at Bramall Lane by 42 runs, with Halliley opening his first-class career with a duck and then two runs batting at number 3 in the order.  He was promoted in the order to open against Notts, scoring his career best 17 in the first innings, but was out for a duck second time round as Yorkshire lost by six runs.  He opened again against Surrey, scoring 8, and Yorkshire won by ten wickets thanks to a century from Ephraim Lockwood. In total, he scored 27 runs at an average of 5.40, with a top score of 17.  He did not bowl but took two catches.

For XVII Colts of England v United North of England XI at Dewsbury in 1872, Halliley made his first-class top score of 52 not out. He also played in other matches against England XIs in 1872.

Halliley died in March 1929 in Ravensthorpe, Yorkshire.

References

Sources
Cricinfo Profile

1852 births
1929 deaths
Yorkshire cricketers
Cricketers from Dewsbury
English cricketers
English cricketers of 1864 to 1889